Gavin Duffy (born 1960) is an Irish entrepreneur and politician.

Gavin Duffy may also refer to:
Gavin Duffy (sportsman) (born 1981), Irish rugby union player and Gaelic footballer

See also
Gavan Duffy (1874–1958), Canadian lawyer